The 1980 All England Championships was a badminton tournament held at Wembley Arena, London, England, from 19–23 March 1980. The event was sponsored by John Player.

Final results

Men's singles

Seeds
1-2  Morten Frost Hansen
1-2  Liem Swie King

Section 1

Section 2

Women's singles

Seeds
1-2  Lene Køppen
5-8  Karen Bridge
 Verawaty Wiharjo
 Ivana Lie
 Gillian Gilks (knocked out round of 64) 
 Saori Kondo
 Yoshiko Yonekura
 Hiroe Yuki

Section 1

Section 2

References

All England Open Badminton Championships
All England
All England Open Badminton Championships in London
All England Badminton Championships
All England Badminton Championships
All England Badminton Championships